Arthur Vincent Mayne (c. 1898 – c. 1974) was a rugby union player who represented Australia.

Mayne, a wing, was born in Sydney and claimed a total of 4 international rugby caps for Australia.

References

                   

Australian rugby union players
Australia international rugby union players
Year of birth uncertain
Rugby union players from Sydney
Rugby union wings